Isaac Adams (1773-5 July 1834) was a politician from Portland, Maine. Adams served in the Massachusetts House of Representatives from 1808 to 1819. After Maine attained statehood in 1820, he served in the Maine House of Representatives; in the first Maine legislative session, he was one of three legislators from Portland and served alongside Asa Clapp and Nicholas Emery. He was elected to single-year terms from 1821 to 1824 and 1826 to 1830. He is buried at Eastern Cemetery in Portland.

References

1773 births
1834 deaths
Burials at Eastern Cemetery
Members of the Massachusetts House of Representatives
Members of the Maine House of Representatives
Politicians from Portland, Maine